Port Brewing Company is a craft brewery headquartered in San Marcos, California.  It was founded in 2006 in San Marcos, San Diego County, California. The brewery also produces beers under the name Lost Abbey Brewing.

History
In 2006, Pizza Port owners Vince and Gina Marsaglia expanded the beer production in a brewing facility formerly owned by Stone Brewing Company in San Marcos. This existing brewery space led to an increase the amount of beers available for distribution. The new brewery project was named Port Brewing Company, LLC.

Beers

Year Round Beers

Seasonal Beers
Seasonal beer includes:

Draft Only

Awards
Hop-15, their Double IPA has received numerous trophies from Great American Beer Festival, notably silver medal in 2003, silver medal in 2005, & bronze medal in 2008.

The brewery and head brewer Tomme Arthur were named Small Brewery of the Year at the 2007 Great American Beer Festival and 2008 Champion Brewery and Champion Brewer in the Small Brewing Company Category at the World Beer Cup.

See also
 California breweries

References

External links 
Port Brewing Company Website
Port Brewing News, Reviews and Events
Beer Advocate Brewery Profile

Beer brewing companies based in San Diego County, California
Companies based in San Diego County, California
Food and drink companies established in 2006
American companies established in 2006